Elliott I. Portnoy (born November 1, 1965) is an American attorney and the Global chief executive officer of Dentons—a law firm that launched March 28, 2013 with the combination of US/UKMEA firm SNR Denton, Canada's Fraser Milner Casgrain and France's Salans, and is now the largest law firm in the world.

Portnoy was previously the chief executive of SNR Denton, a combination between Sonnenschein Nath & Rosenthal LLP and Denton Wilde Sapte. At 41 when he took over as chairman of Sonnenschein, he was the youngest partner to serve in the role and the first outside Chicago, where that firm was founded in 1906. As chairman, he oversaw the growth of Sonnenschein to nearly 800 lawyers and other professionals, including the addition of 100 new attorneys from Thacher Proffitt & Wood LLP on Jan. 1, 2009. Consistent with Portnoy's aim to address the globalization of client needs, his leadership transformed Sonnenschien from its Chicago-based roots into the global firm it is today.

Early life and education
Harvard Law School, J.D., cum laude, 1992Oxford University, Rhodes Scholar, Ph.D., 1986-1989Syracuse University, B.A., summa cum laude, 1986

Career

Sonnenschein Nath & Rosenthal 
Prior to assuming the Sonnenschein chairmanship, Portnoy was chair of the firm's Public Law & Policy Strategies Group, which he founded in 2002. This public policy practice has received national recognition by Chambers USA: America's Leading Lawyers for Business as one of the nation's leading government relations practices and The National Law Journal magazine ranked the group No. 8 on its annual “Influence 50” list of the nation's highest-grossing lobbying practices for 2009.

Dentons 
In line with Portnoy's business vision, the combination of Dentons and Chinese law firm 大成 was announced in January 2015 which created the world's largest law firm upon completion.

2015 saw several major regional expansions for the firm. In April 2015, Dentons US agreed to a merger with Atlanta-based law firm McKenna Long & Aldridge which was completed in June of that year. In November 2015, Dentons completed its combination with 大成 which created the world's largest law firm upon completion, and also announced combinations with offices in Hungary, Luxembourg, and South Africa during 2015.

Awards and honors
In 2009, Portnoy was named the top D.C. lawyer in the category of "Lobbying Law" by the Washington Business Journal. He was also recognized as one of the nation's top lobbyists by Washingtonian magazine, which also credited him for the growth of Sonnenschein's lobbying practice.

He has been selected for the past three years as a prominent government relations specialist by Super Lawyers, and as one of Washington's “Legal Elite” by Washington CEO magazine. Lawdragon named him one of its “100 Managing Partners You Need to Know” in 2008 and in its 2010 edition, Chambers USA calls him “a tremendously respected attorney.”

Community service
In 1988 while studying at Oxford University as a Rhodes Scholar, Portnoy founded the organization Kids Enjoy Exercise Now (KEEN) with his wife, Estee Portnoy, and expanded it to Washington, D.C., in 1992. KEEN is a nonprofit organization that provides sports opportunities to children with severe and profound disabilities. Starting in 2006, the organization expanded beyond Washington, D.C. to eight U.S. cities. Portnoy also serves on the board of directors of several non-profit foundations including the MetaCancer Foundation.

In 1999, Washingtonian magazine named him "Washingtonian of the Year" for his work with Kids Enjoy Exercise Now.

Personal life 
Portnoy is married to Estee Portnoy, an attorney. The couple met as teenagers at a BBYO event in their hometown. Portnoy lives outside of Washington, DC. He has three children.

Notes

1965 births
American Rhodes Scholars
Harvard Law School alumni
Living people
Morgantown High School alumni
Lawyers from Morgantown, West Virginia
People from Washington, D.C.
Syracuse University alumni
Lawyers from Washington, D.C.
Businesspeople from Morgantown, West Virginia